Caroline Gotschall Calloway (born December 5, 1991) is an American internet celebrity known for posting Instagram photos with long captions. She gained popularity while a student at the University of Cambridge.

Early life 
Caroline Calloway Gotschall was born on 5 December 1991 in Falls Church, Virginia. At the age of 17, she changed her last name to Gotschall Calloway, because she said it would "look better on books". Her maternal great-grandfather is Owen Burns, an entrepreneur and real estate mogul who developed many of the historic structures of Sarasota, Florida.

Calloway graduated from high school in 2010 from Phillips Exeter Academy before studying history of art at New York University. In 2013 she left NYU to restart her undergraduate studies at St Edmund's College, Cambridge, after she got in following her third application. She graduated in 2016 with a 2.2.

Career

Influencer 
Calloway joined Instagram in 2012, with the help of her NYU classmate Natalie Beach. Calloway's Instagram account documented her life at Cambridge University and contained lengthy captions accompanied by photographs. Calloway bought followers and purchased ads to grow her account.

In September 2019, Beach wrote an essay for The Cut, "I Was Caroline Calloway", chronicling her friendship and collaborations with Calloway. In her essay, Beach disclosed that she had ghostwritten a number of the captions credited to Calloway and that she had closely collaborated with her to produce a subsequent book proposal.

In July 2021, Calloway began selling a homemade blend of grapeseed oil and essential oils branded as Snake Oil through her website.

Writing

And We Were Like 
In 2016 it was announced that Calloway would publish a memoir titled And We Were Like about her time at Cambridge with Flatiron Books, an imprint of Macmillan Publishers, with the help of literary agent Byrd Leavell. During her final year at Cambridge, Calloway had hired Beach to co-write the book and proposal. She then set up an initial meeting with Leavell by pretending to his secretary that she was already his client. Leavell has since said of his experience working with Calloway that she was "deeply unwell, deeply dishonest" and that "It was more important to her to be seen as an author than it was to be an author. She didn’t know how to be an author."

Calloway publicly announced that Flatiron Books had offered her a book deal to write a memoir for $500,000 in 2015, of which she had received 30% as an advance.  She announced via her Instagram stories in 2017 that she was withdrawing from her book deal after failing to fulfill her contract. Beach reported the deal was for $375,000, and the advance she received was actually for $100,000, which she owed back to the publisher after she cancelled the deal. After that, Calloway offered the book proposal with personal annotations for sale on Etsy.

Writing workshops 
In December 2018, Calloway launched an international "Creativity Workshop Tour". Her original announcement indicated that the workshop would offer tutorials on building an Instagram brand, developing ideas, and addressing "the emotional and spiritual dimensions of making art." Participation in the tour was priced at $165 per person, and tickets were sold for events in Boston, Denver, San Francisco, Los Angeles, Atlanta, Chicago, Dallas, Austin, Charlotte and Washington, DC. This tour was subsequently canceled due to Calloway failing to book venues for these events, with Calloway announcing that she would refund those who had already bought tickets. Eventually, Calloway held two workshops in New York. The cancellation of the workshops gained public attention when reporter Kayleigh Donaldson created a Twitter thread that gained news coverage comparing Calloway's tour to Fyre Festival, later publishing this as an article for the online publication Pajiba. After the publication of Donaldson's article, Calloway briefly offered t-shirts for sale on Threadless, which bore the caption, "Stop hate-following me, Kayleigh". Threadless suspended the sale of these shirts for violating their targeted harassment policy.

In August 2019, Calloway held a second creativity workshop, "The Scam", in New York. Although press was not invited to the event, a Vice reporter bought a ticket, attended the event under a false name, and published an article about her experience.

Forthcoming publications 
In April 2020, Calloway announced that she would publish a response to an essay Beach wrote about her.

Calloway announced in December 2019 that she would publish a memoir, Scammer, that would be printed on demand and shipped in spring 2020. She subsequently stated on her website that because of delays in production, she would instead be combining her blog, "I Am Caroline Calloway", with her manuscript for Scammer instead, allowing her to expand the essay into three parts. In July 2020, Calloway announced that the book was estimated to ship by 31 August 2020. Scammer did not ship on 31 August 2020, and Calloway has not provided any writing, publishing, or shipping updates.

Sex work 
In 2020, Calloway created an OnlyFans account, promising videographic and photographic content containing nudity. She alleged in interviews that her intention to enter the adult entertainment industry had been planned by Playboy, and that the magazine had commissioned a photo shoot of her dressed as a student in a library. When asked, the magazine stated, "Playboy does not have and did not have any photo shoot planned with Caroline Calloway." Calloway has described her sex work as "emotionally poignant, softcore cerebral porn." Her content includes cosplay of characters from children's movies such as Harry Potter, Matilda and Beauty and the Beast, and partially undressed photographs of herself captioned with details of her father's autopsy.

She posted her projected income from sex work on her Twitter account in May 2020, leading to criticism about her failure to recognize difficulties faced by sex workers, as well as her attempts to distance herself from sex work.

Instagram incidents 
In April 2020, Calloway was criticised for posting a tweet with an antisemitic cartoon, with a caption mocking Beach, her former ghostwriter. Calloway later deleted and apologized for the tweet. Calloway further attracted criticism after she liked and shared a suggestion on social media that she should dress up as Anne Frank for her OnlyFans account.

Calloway also attracted criticism for posting an image of Japanese shunga (erotic art) on her Instagram, which depicted a woman copulating with a bat. Calloway captioned the image, "the first human case of the corona outbreak, but make it porn," attracting criticism for engaging in the promotion of stereotypes about Asian cultures, particularly in the context of heightened racism and xenophobia during the COVID-19 pandemic.

Personal life 
Calloway has general anxiety disorder and depression. She has been open about her Adderall abuse and addiction while at Cambridge.

As of March 2022, she no longer resides in New York City.

References

External links

1991 births
Living people
American women bloggers
American bloggers
People from Falls Church, Virginia
Phillips Exeter Academy alumni
Alumni of St Edmund's College, Cambridge
Social media influencers
21st-century American women
OnlyFans creators